Battal is a town and a union council (an administrative subdivision) of Mansehra District in Khyber-Pakhtunkhwa province of Pakistan.

References

Bagh Harori Pain and Harori  Bala (Koz Kelay & Bar Kelay)

Union councils of Mansehra District
Populated places in Mansehra District